Dennis H. Chookaszian is an American businessman and former chairman and CEO of CNA Insurance. He also served as a director on the board of thirteen publicly traded corporations, and currently serves on the board of the Chicago Mercantile Exchange. He is currently a professor of strategic management at the University of Chicago Booth School of Business.

An Eagle Scout, Chookaszian serves on the BSA National Executive Board, the organization's governing board. In 2007 he was awarded the Boy Scouts of America's Silver Buffalo Award for his work with the organization.

References

External links
 Profile in Forbes
 Profile at MDA
 New York Times article on Chookaszian and the CNA purchase of Continental

American chief executives of financial services companies
National Executive Board of the Boy Scouts of America members
Living people
Year of birth missing (living people)
Place of birth missing (living people)
University of Chicago faculty